The BMW HP2 Sport is a boxer-engined sports motorcycle produced by BMW Motorrad from 2008 to 2012. It is the successor to the BMW R1200S.

Design
The engine is a 1,170 cc flat-twin "oilhead" with air-cooled cylinders and oil-cooled heads. The HP2's engine was the most powerful "oilhead" motor before BMW introduced liquid cooling for some of its flat twins in 2013.

At 178 kg (dry) and 128 hp, the HP2 Sport  is even lighter and more powerful than the R1200S on which it is based.  Its frame is tubular steel, like that of the R1200S, but the latter's tubular rear subframe is discarded in favour of a lightweight self-supporting carbon fibre semi-monococque seat unit.

The HP2 Sport is fitted as standard with a quick shifter, Öhlins suspension and many carbon fibre body parts.  Front brake calipers are Brembo "race-spec" Monobloc, wheels are lightweight forged aluminium, and original equipment tyres are Metzeler race compound items.

Reception
The HP2 Sport was very well received.  Motor Cycle News declared it to be  BMW's "finest sporting package ", adding,  "it is a lot of bike with a serious amount of performance goodies ... Not only does it make a brilliant road-going bike, the BMW HP2 will cut up rough at track days."

Range
BMW produced two other very different HP2 machines, the HP2 Megamoto  of 2007-2010, and the HP2 off-road machine of 2005-2008,  neither of which were as well received as the HP2 Sport, however they have very quickly become very serious collector machines commanding high prices on the used market.

References

HP2
Motorcycles powered by flat engines
Shaft drive motorcycles
Motorcycles introduced in 2006